The 1988 Campeonato Nacional was Chilean football league top tier's 56th season. Cobreloa was the tournament's champion, winning its fourth title.

League table

Results

Topscorers

Liguilla Pre-Copa Libertadores

Semifinals 

Deportes Iquique qualified for the final due to its better League head-to-head results (2-1 & 0-0)

Colo-Colo qualified for the final due to its better League head-to-head results (3-1 & 0-0)

Final 

Colo-Colo qualified for the 1989 Copa Libertadores

Promotion/relegation Liguilla

See also 
 1988 Copa Digeder

References

External links 
ANFP 
RSSSF Chile 1988

Primera División de Chile seasons
Chile
Primera